Endla is a small village in Pali district of Rajasthan in Northern India. Endla village has divided into two revenue villages: Endlawas and Jooni Endla. Some of revenue documents  consider Endla (Endlawas & Jooni Endla) as a Gura Endla - 2 revenue village.

Shri Mangilal Chimnoba Choudhary's Bera (Balawala) is midpoint of this village, which has divided this village into two revenue villages. So this village has three names: Endla, Endlawas and Jooni Endla, but most commonly preferred name is Endla . Some of official documents preferred name for this place is Endla. The village Endla has two sub localities Bhaton Ka Dhana (Bhaton ki Dhani) & Meghwalon Ki Dhani. This village is under Pali Lok Sabha and Sumerpur Vidhan Sabha constituencies respectively.

Landmarks

This village is known for the Endla Dam. It has the temple of Mamaji (lok devta).

Economy
Most of population of this village depends on agriculture for their livelihood.

Demographics
The village's population is dominated by Charan the jagirdar of village, रजपुत (not rajput)  Choudhary , Meghwal (Rarbara & Goyal), Rabari , Bhat , Vaishnav castes.

Transport
Endla is well connected with National Highway 62 and there is transportation available to reach the district headquarter Pali and Krishi Anaaj mandi Sumerpur.

Education
 
Currently there are one school (Upper Primary School), one Revenue Office, one Primary Health Centre and one Anganwadi Kendra running to serve the society.

See also
 Pali, Rajasthan

References

External links
 https://web.archive.org/web/20160304233743/http://waterresources.rajasthan.gov.in/bulletin/FNR6/Anx_C.htm
 http://www.mapsofindia.com/maps/rajasthan/districts/pali.htm
 http://translate.google.co.in/translate?hl=en&sl=hi&tl=en&u=http%3A%2F%2Fpali.nic.in%2F&anno=2

Villages in Pali district